The San Diego Metropolitan Transit System (SDMTS or often simply MTS) is a public transit service provider for Central, South, Northeast and Southeast San Diego County. The agency directly operates a large transit system that includes the MTS Bus, San Diego Trolley light rail, and Rapid bus rapid transit services. The MTS also controls the San Diego and Arizona Eastern (SD&AE) freight railway and regulates taxicabs, jitneys, and other private for-hire passenger transportation services.

MTS is one of the oldest transit systems in Southern California, with predecessors dating back as early as the 1880s. The current agency started operations in 1976 as the San Diego Metropolitan Transit Development Board (MTDB) and changed to its current name in 2005.

The MTS works closely with the North County Transit District (NCTD), which operates public transit services in Northern San Diego County, and the San Diego Association of Governments (SANDAG), which plans, develops, and constructs transit projects for both the MTS and NCTD.

History

Origins 

San Diego's public transportation traces its roots back to the San Diego Street Car Company, which opened a single line on July 3, 1886, with cars drawn by two mules or horses. The system would eventually expand to five lines across Downtown San Diego. At the same time as the first horse-drawn line was being inaugurated, there were already plans to start up an electric streetcar service in San Diego, with at least some service starting in November 1887.

The San Diego Electric Railway (SDERy), the direct predecessor of today's MTS, was founded in 1891 by John D. Spreckels (who would later go on to build the San Diego and Arizona Railway). The SDERy would greatly expand electric streetcar service by purchasing several existing transit companies and converted them to electric operation.

In 1910, Spreckels was able to force a ballot initiative that amended his charter with the City of San Diego to give him more than 25 years on his leases to operate streetcar service. Passage of the initiative allowed the SDERy to secure loans that led to service expansion.

The electric streetcar system took a big hit during the "Great Flood" of 1916 that washed out several lines. Rebuilding was a challenge as World War I increased the cost of railway construction materials by 50 to 150 percent. Simultaneously, private automobiles became more common, with many owners picking up work as jitney drivers who would cruise the streetcar routes and pick up fares.

The first motor bus hit the San Diego area streets in 1922, operating between National City and Chula Vista. Over the next two decades, the rail lines would gradually be replaced by motor buses, and on April 24, 1949, the last rail service was discontinued, making San Diego the first major city in California to convert to an all-bus system.

In 1948, the Spreckels family sold the San Diego Electric Railway Company to Jesse L. Haugh, who renamed it the San Diego Transit System and invested in updating and improving the system. Despite the improvements, ridership drops. Facing a financial crisis, the city of San Diego took control of the system in 1967, renaming it the San Diego Transit Corporation, which is to be operated as a non-profit. In 1970, to boost struggling ridership, fares that ranged from 35¢ to $1.15 were lowered to a flat 25¢ fare. By the end of the decade, annual ridership would improve from 18 million to 35 million.

Planning for mass transit 
The Comprehensive Planning Organization (now known as SANDAG), an intergovernmental agency of 13 cities and San Diego County, was established in 1966. The group began planning a mass transit system for the area, studying technologies, alignments, and costs, but the plans went nowhere due to disagreements between stakeholders.

In 1975, California established the San Diego Metropolitan Transit Development Board (MTDB) with a clear mission: plan, construct and operate a mass transit system. The agency formally started operations on January 1, 1976. The MTDB also struggled to resolve stakeholders' disagreements over the same issues of technologies, alignments and costs.

On September 10, 1976, nature intervened, setting off a chain of events that would help decide the first mass transit line.

Hurricane Kathleen destroyed major sections of track and bridges on the San Diego and Arizona Railway's the Desert Line east of San Diego. The Southern Pacific, which had previously purchased the line from the Spreckels family and renamed it the San Diego and Arizona Eastern Railway (SD&AE), wanted to abandon the railway, a request that was denied by the Interstate Commerce Commission in 1978. The MTDB stepped in and offered to buy the SD&AE for $18.1 million if the Southern Pacific fully repaired the line. The deal closed on August 20, 1979.

The purchase gave MTDB two sections of right-of-way that could be used for mass transit: the SD&AE Main Line from Downtown San Diego to the San Ysidro Port of Entry and the SD&AE La Mesa Branch from Downtown San Diego to El Cajon. The MTDB decided to build a relatively low cost light rail system over the tracks, a new idea for the United States, but one that was well established in Germany.

The MTDB also continued to operate the freight operations of the SD&AE. The board reached a deal with the San Diego and Imperial Valley Railroad to continue to move railcars from the end of the Santa Fe Railway in Downtown San Diego to either industrial customers in the San Diego area or to the Mexico–United States border in San Ysidro.

The return of rail 

In August 1980, the MTDB established San Diego Trolley, Inc. to operate and maintain the new light rail system. On July 26, 1981, electric trains began operating the South Line (today's Blue Line) between San Diego and San Ysidro.

In 1985, the city of San Diego transferred control of the San Diego Transit Corporation to the MTDB. The MTDB also coordinated transit services operated by San Diego County and other local agencies. Starting in 1986, all of these services begin operating under a single brand, the San Diego Metropolitan Transit System.

The San Diego Trolley added a second line on March 23, 1986 by redeveloping the La Mesa Branch of the SD&AE into the East Line (today's Orange Line). This line was extended to El Cajon by June 23, 1989. Service was expanded beyond the old SD&AE right-of-way when the line was extended further east to Santee on August 26, 1995.

The East Line's Bayside extension to the Convention Center and Gaslamp Quarter opened on June 30, 1990. Later in the decade, the South Line was extended to the north, reaching Little Italy on July 2, 1992, Old Town on June 16, 1996, and Mission San Diego on November 23, 1997. At that the same time, the South Line and East Line of the system were renamed the Blue Line and the Orange Line, respectively.

One of the system's most ambitious expansions opened on July 10, 2005. The Mission Valley East extension built the only underground station in the system at San Diego State University and inaugurated the third route in the San Diego Trolley system, the Green Line.

On January 1, 2003, the state consolidated the planning, development, and construction functions of the MTDB and the North San Diego County Transit Development Board into the San Diego Association of Governments (SANDAG) to create a consolidated regional transportation planning and development agency.

With the San Diego Metropolitan Transit Development Board no longer in charge of developing future transit projects, the MTDB changed its name to the Metropolitan Transit System (MTS) in 2005.

Modern history 
In 2007, MTS completed a "Comprehensive Operational Analysis" that redesigned the area's bus network for the first time in 23 years. National City was reluctant to implement the findings of the analysis and instead opts to transfer control of its National City Transit system into MTS.

The major overhaul of the San Diego Trolley called the "Trolley Renewal Project" began in 2010. Over the next five years, all Trolley stations were renovated, making them capable of handling low-floor light rail vehicles that eliminate the stairs into the trains and allow faster boarding for people using wheelchairs. The renovations allow the Green Line to be extended to Downtown in 2012. Low-floor vehicles start operating on the Orange Line in 2013 and on the Blue Line in 2015.

In 2011, MTS opened the Silver Line, which operates renovated PCC streetcars around Downtown San Diego in partnership with the San Diego historic streetcar society.

SDMTS introduced its network of bus rapid transit routes in June 2014. The lines operate on exclusive roadways, dedicated lanes, high-occupancy vehicle lanes, and in mixed-traffic with other vehicles.

In 2016, the San Diego Trolley began construction of the Mid-Coast Corridor Transit Project. It is an  extension of the Blue Line from the Old Town Transit Center north to La Jolla Village, University of California, San Diego and University City. Ridership is projected at 34,700 trips in 2030. The extension was completed and opened for service on November 21, 2021, costing $2.1 billion.

Divisions

San Diego Trolley 

The MTS Rail Operations division oversees the San Diego Trolley (colloquially known as "The Trolley")  a system of light rail routes: the Blue Line, the Green Line, the Orange Line, and the Silver Line, which operates using heritage streetcars on select days. The system is operated by San Diego Trolley, Inc. (SDTI), a subsidiary of the MTS. The Trolley began service on July 26, 1981, making it the oldest of the second-generation light rail systems in the United States. In 2019, the Trolley had the 5th highest ridership of light rail systems in the United States, with 38,047,300 annual rides, an average of 117,700 rides per weekday.

 The Blue Line, which opened in 1981, operates between the UTC Transit Center, UC San Diego, Downtown San Diego, and the international border at San Ysidro.
 The Orange Line, which opened in 1986, operates between Downtown San Diego and eastern suburban areas such as El Cajon and La Mesa.
 The Green Line, which opened in 2005, operates between Downtown San Diego, Old Town, Mission Valley, San Diego State University, El Cajon, and Santee.
 The Silver Line, which opened in 2011, operates around Downtown San Diego on select days using heritage streetcars.

MTS Bus Operations 
The MTS Bus Operations division oversees 85 "MTS Bus" fixed-route services, nine "Rapid" bus rapid transit routes, and the "MTS Access" paratransit service. Routes are operated by private contractors and by the San Diego Transit Corporation (SDTC), a subsidiary of the MTS. The SDTC operates 27 routes based out of Downtown San Diego (Imperial Avenue Division) and Kearny Mesa (Kearny Mesa Division), Transdev operates 52 routes based out of Chula Vista (South Bay Division) and El Cajon (East County Division), while First Transit operates the "MTS Access" paratransit service and 21 fixed-route services that are operated with mini-buses based out of Kearny Mesa (Copley Park Division). All buses and division facilities, even those used by contractors, are owned by the MTS.

"MTS Bus" fixed-route services 

Urban bus routes link the densely populated neighborhoods and adjacent cities together with direct and frequent bus services. These services constitute the bulk of fixed-route bus services operated in terms of vehicle requirements and patronage. Typically, headways are 12–15 minutes between scheduled bus arrival/departure times during commute periods and during midday times on the busiest lines. Generally, no worse than 30-minute headways occur during non-commute periods or 60-minute headways weekends. Local routes generally have stops placed every block or every other block. Limited-stop lines have stops placed every approximately quarter to half-mile.

Five express fixed-route bus lines (Routes 20, 60, 110, 140, and 950) are operated along major roadways and highways and link intermediate distant suburban areas to the San Diego urban area. Two of the six express lines (Routes 60 and 110) only operate during the morning and evening weekday commute periods.

Rural transit services (Routes 888, 891, 892 and 894) link the sparsely populated central and eastern portions of San Diego County to the San Diego Trolley and other fixed-route transit services at the El Cajon Transit Center. These lines offer much less frequent service – Route 888 only operates on Mondays and Fridays, Route 891 on Fridays, and Route 892 on Thursdays. Only Route 894 operates Mondays through Fridays.

"Rapid" bus rapid transit service 

Rapid is a network of nine bus rapid transit (BRT) routes in the San Diego area. The lines operate on exclusive roadways, dedicated lanes, high-occupancy vehicle lanes, and in mixed-traffic with other vehicles.

 Routes 201, 202 and 204 offer frequent service in the University City and La Jolla Village areas near the University of California, San Diego. Initial service began in June 2009, with an extension in March 2013.
 Route 215 offers frequent service between San Diego State University and Downtown San Diego, using dedicated lanes on Park and El Cajon Boulevards to speed travel times. It opened for service in October 2014.
 Route 225 offers frequent service between the Otay Mesa Port of Entry, Chula Vista, and Downtown San Diego, using the high-occupancy vehicle lanes of Interstate 805 and an exclusive roadway along East Palomar Street and in the Otay Ranch neighborhood to speed travel times. Initial service began in September 2018, with an extension in January 2019.
 Route 235 offers frequent service between Escondido and Downtown San Diego, using the high-occupancy vehicle lanes of Interstate 15, with dedicated ramps to transit centers, to speed travel times. It opened for service in June 2014.
 Route 237 offers limited service between the University of California, San Diego's "Gilman Transit Center" (with connections to the 201 and 202 above) and Miramar College. Route 237 operates during peak hours only and travels in mixed-traffic with other vehicles. It opened for service in October 2014.
 Route 280 offers limited, express service between Escondido and Downtown San Diego, using the high-occupancy vehicle lanes of Interstate 15, with a dedicated ramp to the Del Lago Transit Station, to speed travel times. The route operates during peak hours only. It opened for service in June 2014.
 Route 290 offers limited, express service between Rancho Bernardo and Downtown San Diego, using the high-occupancy vehicle lanes of Interstate 15, with dedicated ramps to transit centers, to speed travel times. The route operates during peak hours only. It opened for service in June 2014.

"MTS Access" paratransit service 
Paratransit services, operated under the name "MTS Access," provide point-to-point service upon request to passengers registered with MTS as being qualified for assistance under the Americans with Disabilities Act. Service is available throughout the MTS service area, and connections to a similar NCTD service are also available. Vehicles are typically mini-buses equipped with wheelchair lifts and tie-downs.

San Diego and Arizona Eastern Railway 

The San Diego and Arizona Eastern Railway (SD&AE) is a subsidiary of the MTS that manages and leases railroad tracks for freight service. The San Diego and Imperial Valley Railroad has exclusive trackage rights move railcars from the end of the BNSF Railway in Downtown San Diego to either industrial customers in the San Diego area or to the Mexico–United States border in San Ysidro over the SD&AE Main Line and La Mesa Branch. The Baja California Railroad holds the right to operate over the SD&AE Desert Line in the Imperial Valley.

For-Hire Vehicle Administration 
The For-Hire Vehicle Administration division licenses and regulates taxicabs, jitneys, non-emergency patient transport services, and other private for-hire passenger transportation services provided by contract in the cities of San Diego, El Cajon, Imperial Beach, La Mesa, Lemon Grove, Poway and Santee.

Governance 
MTS is a joint powers authority agency, or JPA. Member cities include San Diego, Chula Vista, Coronado, El Cajon, Imperial Beach, La Mesa, Lemon Grove, National City, Poway, Santee, and San Diego County. Elected officials from each jurisdiction, including San Diego County, serve as the Board of Directors. The city of San Diego has the most representation with four members. A county resident is elected by the Board of Directors to serve as the Chairman.

See also 

Transportation in San Diego County

References

External links 

 
Southern Area System Map
NCTD System Map
 MTS Historical Timeline
 List of MTS bus routes

 
Public transportation in San Diego County, California
Transportation in San Diego
Bus transportation in California
Passenger rail transportation in California
Intermodal transportation authorities in California
1886 establishments in California
Transit authorities with natural gas buses